Craig Boyd Allen (born 1957) is an American diplomat who served as United States Ambassador to Brunei from 2014 to 2018.

Consular career
Allen began working for the Department of Commerce as part of the International Trade Administration in 1985. He began as a Presidential Management Intern and, in 1986, he took up a post at the ITA's China Office. Allen worked there for two years before being moved to the American Institute in Taiwan to be the Director of the American Trade Center in Taipei.

In 1992, Allen re-joined the Department of Commerce and was given a three-year posting in the U.S. embassy in Beijing, where he served as a Commercial Attaché. After the posting, Allen moved to the U.S. Embassy in Tokyo to be a Commercial Attaché there but in 1998, he was promoted to the post of Deputy Senior Commercial Officer and the next year, Allen became a member of the Senior Foreign Service.

In 2000, Allen was recalled to work at the National Center for APEC in Seattle. Two years later, Allen returned to Beijing to be Senior Commercial Officer at the U.S. Mission to China, serving under Clark T. Randt Jr. and managing the whole of the Department of Commerce's delegation at the embassy.

In 2006, Allen was assigned to be Senior Commercial Officer at the U.S. consulate in Johannesburg and was responsible for the Department of Commerce's operations in all 16 SADC countries. In 2010, Allen became the Deputy Assistant Secretary for Asia at the ITA and then, in 2012, the Deputy Assistant Secretary for China.

He was nominated to be the U.S. Ambassador to Brunei by President Obama on July 10, 2014 and was confirmed  on December 19, 2014. He presented his credentials on March 9, 2015.

Post-Consular Career 
In July 2018, the US-China Business Council named Allen to succeed John Frisbie as their President.

In July 2022, Allen helped found a group of U.S. business and policy leaders who share the goal of constructively engaging with China in order to improve U.S.-China relations.

References

1957 births
Living people
Ambassadors of the United States to Brunei
University of Michigan alumni
Walsh School of Foreign Service alumni
United States Foreign Service personnel
People of the American Institute in Taiwan